Stefaan Van Hecke is a Belgian (Flemish) politician. He is member of the Belgian Federal Parliament (Chamber of Representatives of Belgium) for the ecological party Groen!. He was first elected in June 2007. He was re-elected in 2010, 2014, and 2019.

Biography
Van Hecke obtained a law degree at Ghent University. To learn more about environmental law, he also got a degree in Environmental Science at the University of Antwerp.

Political career
His political career started in 1990, when he joined "Agalev" (the then so-called green party in Flanders) in his home town Merelbeke. In 1992 he founded "Jong Agalev", the youngsters division of the green party, in Merelbeke. In 1996 he was elected into the provincial council. He kept that mandate until 2006.

In the local and provincial elections in Merelbeke, Stefaan Van Hecke changed the provincial council for the city council. He led his party to a glorious victory, achieving almost 14% of the votes, which was never seen before for a green party in Flanders. This victory led directly to him being chosen to lead Groen! in the provincial constituency of Eastern Flanders for the national parliament. After a hard campaign, Stefaan Van Hecke was elected.

References

Flemish politicians
Living people
Groen (political party) politicians
1973 births
Ghent University alumni
University of Antwerp alumni
21st-century Belgian politicians